Kert Haavistu (born 18 January 1980) is a former Estonian professional footballer, who used to play in the Meistriliiga for FC Flora Tallinn and FC TVMK Tallinn. He is also the former member of the Estonia national football team with 44 caps to his name.

He is the first Estonian footballer who has played in Estonia national team in football, futsal and beach soccer.

Haavistu has played beach soccer in S.C. Real/Triobet.

He has been the head coach of the Estonia national beach soccer team and Estonia national futsal team.

Haavistu has worked as a youth coach for Tallinna SC Real and now owns a restaurant in Malta.

Personal
He has a younger brother, Mikk Haavistu, who also played football and beach soccer.

References

External links
Rannajalgpallikoondise kapteniks valiti Kert Haavistu Postimees, 19 March 2008 

1980 births
Living people
Footballers from Tallinn
Estonian footballers
Estonian football managers
FC Flora players
FC TVMK players
Estonia international footballers
Estonian beach soccer players
Estonian men's futsal players
Association football midfielders